The Batasia Loop is a spiral railway created to lower the gradient of ascent of the Darjeeling Himalayan Railway in Darjeeling district of West Bengal, India. At this point, the track spirals around over itself through a tunnel and over a hilltop. It was commissioned in 1919.

Location
There is also a memorial to the Gorkha soldiers of the Indian Army who sacrificed their lives after the Indian Independence in 1947.

See also
Chowrasta
Balloon loop
 History of Darjeeling Himalayan Railway
 Zig zag (railway)

References

External links

 About Batasia Loop
Batasia Loop Travel Information North Bengal Tourism

Tourist attractions in Darjeeling
Mountain railways in India
1919 establishments in India
1919 in rail transport
Rail transport in West Bengal
Railway loop lines
Transport in Darjeeling